Arcadia High School is a public high school in Phoenix, Arizona. The school enrolls 1,680 students, who mostly come from feeder schools in the Scottsdale Unified School District.

History 
The school was built 1958/59. It was designed by local architect Mel Ensign and built by Gilbert & Dolan Construction Co. The campus was noted for its round buildings and futuristic space age design. Between 2005 and 2008 much of the original campus was demolished and a new campus was built in its place. The new campus was designed by Orcutt/Winslow Partnership and built by DL Withers Construction Co. The circular library is the only original building that remains.

Extracurricular activities

Athletics
The school competes in interscholastic athletics in several sports. Arcadia was formerly 5A Northeast Valley, and moved to 4A Desert Sky by the conference alignment committee due to enrollment.

Badminton
Baseball
Basketball (Boys)
Basketball (Girls)
Cross-Country
Football
Golf (Boys)
Golf (Girls)
Soccer (Boys)
Soccer (Girls)
Softball
Swimming and Diving
Tennis (Boys)
Tennis (Girls)
Track and Field
Volleyball
Spiritline
Robotics
Lacrosse

Notable alumni
Ryan Thomas Andersen, director and winner of 2014 Doritos Crash the Super Bowl contest
Paul Cristo, composer
Adam Driggs, former Arizona State Senator
Lynda Carter, actress
Sam Huff, professional baseball catcher
Dianne Kay, actress
Charles Keating IV Famous Navy Seal
Kalyn Keller, Olympic swimmer
Klete Keller, Olympic gold medalist swimmer and alleged participant in the 2021 storming of the United States Capitol
Haley Lu Richardson, actress
Michele Mitchell (diver), two-time Olympic silver medalist
Glenn Rockowitz, writer and voice actor
William Shepherd,  Astronaut, Engineer
Steven Spielberg, film and TV director, producer
Gabe Suárez, professional baseball player and manager

Notable staff
 Kerry Taylor, a former American football player who began coaching at the school in 2018

References

External links

Scottsdale Unified School District
Arcadia High School Homepage

Educational institutions established in 1958
High schools in Phoenix, Arizona
1958 establishments in Arizona